Marcel Balkestein (born 29 January 1981 in Geldrop) is a Dutch field hockey player.  At the 2012 Summer Olympics, he competed for the national team in the men's tournament, and was part of the Dutch team that won the silver medal.

Balkestein married the Dutch volleyball player Maret Balkestein-Grothues on 5 July 2014.

References

External links
 

1981 births
Living people
Dutch male field hockey players
Field hockey players at the 2012 Summer Olympics
Olympic field hockey players of the Netherlands
Olympic silver medalists for the Netherlands
Olympic medalists in field hockey
People from Geldrop
Sportspeople from North Brabant
Medalists at the 2012 Summer Olympics
Hockey India League players
2010 Men's Hockey World Cup players
2014 Men's Hockey World Cup players
21st-century Dutch people